Morocco competed at the 2016 Summer Olympics in Rio de Janeiro, Brazil, from 5 to 21 August 2016. This was the nation's fourteenth appearance at the Summer Olympics.

Moroccan Olympic Committee fielded a squad of 49 athletes, 29 men and 20 women, across 13 sports at the Games. It was the nation's largest delegation sent to the Olympics without any participants in team-based sports, but third-largest overall in history. Nearly forty percent of the Moroccan delegation competed in the track and field; there was only a single competitor in slalom canoeing, equestrian, fencing, golf (new to the 2016 Games), and shooting.

Fifteen athletes on the Moroccan roster competed at the previous Olympics in London, with the rest of the field making their Olympic debut in Rio de Janeiro. Among the nation's athletes were 2012 bronze medalist Abdalaati Iguider in distance running, taekwondo fighter Wiam Dislam (women's +67 kg), Greco-Roman wrestler Zied Ayet Ikram, who competed for Tunisia at the previous Games, and 54-year-old show jumper Abdelkebir Ouaddar, who led his delegation as the oldest competitor and flag bearer in the opening ceremony.

For the second Olympics in a row, Morocco left Rio de Janeiro with only a bronze medal, won by world-ranked pro boxer Mohammed Rabii in the men's welterweight division. Five Moroccan athletes advanced to the finals of their respective sporting events but narrowly missed out of the podium, including Iguider, Dislam, along with her fellow taekwondo teammates Omar Hajjami and Naima Bakkal, and steeplechaser Soufiane Elbakkali.

Medalists

Athletics (track and field)
 
Moroccan athletes have so far achieved qualifying standards in the following athletics events (up to a maximum of 3 athletes in each event):

A total of 18 athletes (13 men and 5 women), highlighted by middle-distance runner and London 2012 bronze medalist Abdalaati Iguider, were named as part of Morocco's official team announcement for the Games on July 15, 2016.

Track & road events
Men

Women

Boxing
 
Morocco has entered eight boxers to compete in each of the following weight classes into the Olympic boxing tournament. Mohammed Rabii was the only Moroccan to be selected to the Olympic team through the 2015 World Championships, while Achraf Kharroubi and Mohamed Hamout finished among the top two of their respective weight divisions in the World Series of Boxing.

Mohamed Arjaoui and three women's boxers (Ez-Zahraoui, Lachgar, and El-Mardi) had claimed their Olympic spots at the 2016 African Qualification Tournament in Yaoundé, Cameroon.

Hassan Saada secured an additional Olympic place on the Moroccan roster as a quarterfinalist losing to the eventual champion Teymur Mammadov of Azerbaijan at the 2016 AIBA World Qualifying Tournament in Baku.

Men

Women

Canoeing

Slalom
Morocco has qualified one canoeist in the women's K-1 class by obtaining a top finish at the 2015 African Canoe Slalom Championships in Sagana, Kenya.

Cycling

Road
Moroccan riders qualified for a maximum of three quota places in the men's Olympic road race by virtue of their top 4 national ranking in the 2015 UCI Africa Tour.

Equestrian
 
Morocco has entered one jumping rider into the Olympic equestrian competition by virtue of a top national finish from Africa & Middle East in the individual International Federation for Equestrian Sports (FEI) Olympic Rankings.

Jumping

Fencing

Morocco has entered one fencer into the Olympic competition. Youssra Zekrani had claimed her Olympic spot as the sole winner of the women's foil at the African Zonal Qualifier in Algiers, Algeria.

Golf 

Morocco has entered one golfer into the Olympic tournament. Maha Haddioui (world no. 560) qualified directly among the top 60 eligible players for the women's event based on the IGF World Rankings as of 11 July 2016.

Judo

Morocco has qualified three judokas for each of the following weight classes at the Games. Imad Bassou and Assmaa Niang were ranked among the top 22 eligible judokas for men and top 14 for women in the IJF World Ranking List of May 30, 2016, while London 2012 Olympian Rizlen Zouak at women's half-middleweight (63 kg) earned a continental quota spot from the African region, as the highest-ranked Moroccan judoka outside of direct qualifying position.

Shooting

Morocco has received an invitation from ISSF to send Mohamed Ramah in the men's double trap to the Olympics, as long as the minimum qualifying score (MQS) was fulfilled by March 31, 2016.

Qualification Legend: Q = Qualify for the next round; q = Qualify for the bronze medal (shotgun)

Swimming

Morocco has received a Universality invitation from FINA to send two swimmers (one male and one female) to the Olympics.

Taekwondo
 
Morocco entered one athlete into the taekwondo competition at the Olympics. Omar Hajjami, Hakima El-Meslahy, and 2012 Olympian Wiam Dislam secured the spots on the Moroccan team respectively in the men's flyweight (58 kg), women's lightweight (57 kg), and women's heavyweight category (+67 kg) by virtue of their top two finish at the 2016 African Qualification Tournament in Agadir.

Weightlifting

Morocco has qualified one male weightlifter for the Rio Olympics by virtue of a top five national finish at the 2016 African Championships, signifying the nation's Olympic return to the sport for the first time since 2004. Meanwhile, an unused women's Olympic spot was added to the Moroccan weightlifting team by IWF, as a response to the vacancy of women's quota places in the individual World Rankings and to the "multiple positive cases" of doping on several nations. The team must allocate these places to individual athletes by June 20, 2016.

Wrestling

Morocco has qualified three wrestlers for each of the following weight classes into the Olympic competition, as a result of their semifinal triumphs at the 2016 African & Oceania Qualification Tournament.

Men's freestyle

Men's Greco-Roman

See also
Morocco at the 2016 Summer Paralympics

References

External links

 
 

Nations at the 2016 Summer Olympics
2016
Olympics